Cortes de Baza is a municipality located in the province of Granada, Spain. According to the Instituto de Estadistica y Cartografia de Andalucia (2020)  , the village has a population of 1844 inhabitants.

Geography
Cortes de Baza is located in the north of the Province of Granada along the eastern banks of the Rio Castril.

History

It has been the site of human settlement since prehistoric times. It has been settled by Romans, Moors and later by the Christians after the Reconquista of Andalucia in the fifteenth century.

Buildings

Cortes de Baza has a sixteenth-century church built in the Mudéjar style constructed by Moorish Craftsmen.

Economy

The town is very rural with Farming and Poplar tree plantations covering a wide area, tourism is also becoming a main source of income. The town is very typical of this area.

References

Municipalities in the Province of Granada